Moritzberg is a mountain of Bavaria, Germany. It is part of the Franconian Jura range.

Hills of Bavaria
Mountains and hills of the Franconian Jura